Einstein High School could refer to

 Einstein High School in the Los Angeles Unified School District
 Albert Einstein High School in Montgomery County, Maryland